Theater Institute Chattagram (TIC), is a theatre and cultural convention center located in Chattogram, Bangladesh. It is a theater hall of drama, film and performing arts. The institute is organized and controlled by the City Corporation of the Chittagong district.

Activiries
The institute arrange various programs such as dance, drama festivals, music, film festivals workshops, exhibitions, etc. The institute is well known, mostly for its various programs that are staged monthly.

World Theater Day Celebration
Every year 27 March is celebrated as World Theatre Day since 1962 by the centres of the International Theatre Institute, following the organization's decision of the previous year. In 2013, a similar program was organized at Theatre Institute Chattagram.

References

Theatres in Chittagong
Organisations based in Chittagong
Cultural organisations based in Bangladesh